The Pleasance is a street just outside the Old Town of Edinburgh, Scotland, a remnant of the Flodden Wall flanking the west side of the street between Drummond Street and the Cowgate. Historically, the street was one of the main routes into Edinburgh from the south, meeting St Mary's Wynd (now St Mary's Street) at St Mary's Wynd Port, one of the gateways of the town walls. The name derives from the Scots plesance, meaning a park or garden. It first appears in 1507 as the name of a nearby house, and was later transferred to the street and then the suburb which was part of the regality of the Canongate. The derivation of the name from a nunnery of St Mary of Placentia, often mentioned in histories of Edinburgh, is an invention by William Maitland in his 1753 History of Edinburgh.

The street is largely residential - mainly 19th century tenements and 20th century flats - although the University of Edinburgh owns property in the area, including a large new [2017] university student flats complex on St Leonard's Street, the southerly extension of the Pleasance, on a site formerly occupied by a Homebase home improvements and gardening store.  In addition, although the Pleasance along with St Leonard's Street is a quieter area than the nearby main commercial centres and streets of the Southside there are several restaurants, pubs, a few shops, lawyers' offices, churches, and the modern St Leonard's police station. After years of planning blight from the 1960s and 1970s in which redevelopment of the formerly rather run-down area was hampered after the abandonment of bizarre plans to build a major road comparable to a motorway, from the late 20th century onwards the area benefited from a gradual renaissance.

University of Edinburgh union buildings
 
The Pleasance contains a complex of university-owned buildings which, for nine months of the year, operate as one of the four Student Union venues that serve the Edinburgh University Students' Association. In August, the complex is converted to use as one of the major venues of the Edinburgh Festival Fringe, for which it is most publicly well-known. The Pleasance Theatre Trust, named after the complex, runs the venue during the Fringe, as well as a sister venue in London. 

The Pleasance complex consists of two main bars: The Pleasance Bar and The Cabaret Bar; the Pleasance Theatre (with a capacity of 320); and several rooms that can be booked out for society use. Two LCD televisions and a large projector also ensure that all major sporting events are shown in the main bar. The Pleasance is the only one of the four student unions to hold a public licence, which means anyone can gain access without having to be a university student or signed in by a member.

As well as providing the opportunity to purchase food and drink, the Pleasance complex maintains a program of evening entertainment. Live comedy traditionally takes place on Tuesday evenings, with acts such as Russell Howard and Jim Jefferies appearing in recent years. The Edinburgh Folk Club use the Cabaret Bar as the venue for their gigs on Wednesday nights. However the busiest evenings of the week normally fall on Monday nights, with the Pleasance Pub Quiz for instance attracting up to 40 teams on occasions in recent years.

References

External links
 Pleasance Trust website

Streets in Edinburgh